Father Is a Prince is a 1940 comedy film directed by Noel M. Smith, starring Grant Mitchell and Nana Bryant. Father is a Prince is a remake of the 1934 comedy-drama Big Hearted Herbert, itself based on a play by Sophie Kerr.

Plot
John Bower is a demanding father, tight with a dollar and rigid in insisting that his son Junior someday come into the carpet-sweeper business with him. His demure wife Susan puts up with his iron-fisted and tight-fisted ways.

Connie, their daughter, is in love with Gary Lee, a bright young college graduate. They wish to marry but aren't sure how to break the news, so she invites Gary and his parents to dinner. John ruins the evening for everyone with his temper. Susan says she wants a divorce, finally bringing her husband to his senses.

Cast

References

External links 
 
 
 
 

1940 romantic comedy films
American romantic comedy films
American black-and-white films
Films based on multiple works
Films based on American novels
American films based on plays
Films directed by Noel M. Smith
Warner Bros. films
Films based on adaptations
1940 films
1940s English-language films
1940s American films